Nowhere Man may refer to:

Music 
 "Nowhere Man" (song), a 1965 song by The Beatles
 Nowhere Man (EP), a 1966 EP by The Beatles featuring the song "Nowhere Man"
 "Nowhere Man", a song by Anti-Nowhere League from We Are...The League
 "The Nowhere Man", a song by The Veils from The Runaway Found

Film and television 
 Nowhere Man (Taiwanese TV series), 2019 crime thriller drama series by Netflix
 Nowhere Man (American TV series), 1995 drama series
 Nowhere Man (Heroes), webseries based on the TV series Heroes
 "Nowhere Man" (Law & Order), 2004 episode of Law & Order
 Nowhere Man (film), 1991 Japanese film directed by and starring Naoto Takenaka
 "Nowhere Man", episode of TV series Haven
 Nowhere Man, 1961 Soviet film starring Anatoli Papanov
 Nowhere Man, 2005 film written and directed by Tim McCann
 The Nowhere Man, 2005 film starring Lorenzo Lamas
 Jeremy Hillary Boob or the "Nowhere Man", a fictional character from the 1968 Beatles film Yellow Submarine

Literature

Comics 
 Nowhere Man (comics), a title from Virgin Comics
 Nowhere Man, manga by Yoshiharu Tsuge published in English as The Man Without Talent
 Nowhere Man, a minor DC Comics character
 Nowhere Man, a fictional character in the Malibu Comics series Protectors
 "Nowhere Man", a chapter of the manga Peace Maker

Novels 
 The Nowhere Man (Hurwitz novel), a 2017 novel by Gregg Hurwitz
 Nowhere Man, a 2010 novel by John M. Green
 Nowhere Man (Hemon novel), a 2002 novel by Aleksandar Hemon
 The Nowhere Man (Kamala Markandaya novel), a 1972 novel by Kamala Markandaya
 The Nowhere Man, a 1998 novel by Ruth Glick (writing as Rebecca York)
 Nowhere Man, a novel by Sheila Quigley

Nonfiction 
 Nowhere Man: The Final Days of John Lennon, a 2000 biography by Robert Rosen

Other uses 
 Nowhere Man, a 2004 dance/theatre work produced by Kage Physical Theatre
 Nowhere Man, a hacker who released the Virus Creation Laboratory in 1992

See also 
 Nowhere Boy, 2009 British-Canadian film about John Lennon
 Nowheremen, social reality game and web video series
 Nowhere Men, comic series by Eric Stephenson